Protect the Innocent may refer to:
 Protect the Innocent (Motörhead album), a 1997 compilation album by Motörhead
 Protect the Innocent (Rachel Sweet album), a 1980 album by Rachel Sweet